The Brunei Pan-Borneo Highway is a network of national roads in Brunei that forms the Bruneian section of the larger Pan-Borneo Highway network, with the total length of . Due to its geography, the Brunei Pan-Borneo Highway is divided into two sections that are sandwiched between the three sections of Malaysian Pan-Borneo Highway in Sarawak.

List of interchanges, intersections and towns

Jalan Rasau Bypass

Jalan Seria Bypass

Jalan Lumut Bypass

Jalan Tutong–Seria

Jalan Tutong Bypass

Muara–Tutong Highway

Jalan Jerudong

Jalan Tutong

Jalan Mulaut–Limau Manis

Jalan Bangar–Puni–Ujong Jalan

Jalan Labu

References

Roads and Highways in Brunei